Heaven is a Gay superclub in Charing Cross, London, England.  It has played a central role and had a major influence in the development of London's LGBT scene for the last 40 years and is home to long-running gay night G-A-Y. The club is known for Paul Oakenfold's acid house events in the 1980s, the underground nightclub festival Megatripolis, and for being the birthplace of ambient house.

Soundshaft also hosted Future, a regular night on Thursdays run by Paul Oakenfold. At the end of the night, both crowds would come together when the doors connecting Heaven & Future opened for the last couple of songs.

History

Beginnings
Heaven was opened in December 1979 by Jeremy Norman in a former night club called Global Village, which was housed in the arches beneath Charing Cross railway station, once part of Adelphi Arches, a large wine-cellar for the hotel above. Norman was also chairman of Burke's Peerage, the publishers. The original hi-tech interior was designed by his partner, Derek Frost. Norman, an entrepreneur, had started an earlier club, The Embassy, in Old Bond Street in 1978. The Embassy proved to be successful and attracted a fashionable clientele; it is generally seen as the London equivalent of New York's Studio 54. Norman used his knowledge and experience of establishing and running a nightclub to create an entirely new kind of gay club on a larger scale. Heaven quickly established itself as the centre of the (then understated) gay London nightlife. Until it opened, most gay clubs were small hidden cellar-bars or pub discos. Heaven brought gay clubbing into the UK mainstream and gave London a club to rival New York's gay super club at the time, The Saint.

Heaven's first resident DJ was Ian Levine, who has been credited with being one of the first DJs in the UK of the now customary style of "beatmixing". His mix of Disco and  Hi-NRG became what is known as the Original Heaven Sound.

Under the direction of the club's original manager David Inches and independent promotions Manager Kevin Millins, Heaven sought DJs who would become exclusive to the club and were groundbreaking in terms of their music selection and style. Many Heaven DJs would go on to find greater acclaim in both the gay and mainstream music industry. Original Heaven DJs include: Tony De Vit, Colin Holsgrove, Marc Andrews, Marc Monroe, George Mitchell, Ian D, Tallulah, Jon Dennis, Rich B, Wayne G, and Steve Whyte. Heaven also attracted legendary names from the United States such as House music pioneer Frankie Knuckles, who played at the Thursday night Delirium!.

1980s/1990s

In 1980, London Weekend Television ran a weekly documentary series titled Gay Life in which Heaven nightclub and various other London gay clubs and bars were featured.

In 1982, Heaven was acquired from Norman by Richard Branson's Virgin Group. Branson was one of the first to identify the burgeoning 'pink pound' and saw the club as an investment opportunity, Branson reported in his autobiography that the £500,000 used to purchase Heaven were financed by the brewery supplying drinks to the venue.

Kevin Millins' club night Asylum (on Thursdays) started on 14 April 1983, with resident DJs Colin Faver and Mark Moore (S'Express). By 1985 this had become Pyramid (shifted to Wednesdays) and was one of the first clubs in the country to play emerging House music from Chicago.

As one of the first gay clubs in London, and one of the first openly so in the world, Heaven courted controversy, frequently appearing in the tabloid press, especially in The Sun headlines about ecstasy use in the nightclub in 1989.

In the late 1980s, Heaven would host two what would become legendary nights during the height of Acid House, Techno, and Breakbeat Hardcore rave culture. The first was Spectrum promoted by Paul Oakenfold and Ian St Paul, which ran on Monday nights between April 1988 and 1990, and the other was Kevin Millins' Rage, a Thursday night running between October 1988 and 1993 which included DJs Fabio & Grooverider, Colin Faver, and Trevor Fung. Oakenfold brought in Jimmy Cauty and Alex Paterson (The Orb) as ambient DJs for his "The Land of Oz" nights at Heaven, club nights which Dom Phillips in Mixmag called "seminal". These chillout sessions in "The White Room", also  involving Youth, heralded the birth of ambient house. Cauty's other band, The KLF, made their premier live performance at the Land of Oz in July 1989.

Replacing Rage on Thursday from October 1993 until 1996 was Megatripolis, with Mixmaster Morris and regular guests such as Mr. C and Alex Paterson.

In the mid 1990s, Wednesday night was Fruit Machine, hosted by Miss Kimberly with a strong Drag theme. Fridays were Garage playing Techno and Hardbag with DJs Blu Peter and Mrs Wood. Saturday nights were 'Heaven is Saturday – Saturday is Heaven' which hosted a variety of parties and weekly changing themes.

Soundshaft
Soundshaft was a small club attached to Heaven, which had a separate entrance on Hungerford Lane, behind Craven Street, although it was also accessible from the main club. Between 1988 and 1990, this hosted the seminal Troll night and which launched the career of DJs Daz Saund and Luke Slater. It is now called The Stage Bar.

1998 Relaunch
In 1998, the club was refurbished and relaunched as a more mainstream venue to challenge increasingly popular clubs such as Trade and The Fridge. As part of this broadening appeal, a new Monday Indie night called Room Two started alongside its more trademark night of Popcorn which started on a Monday (and replaced Fridays Popstarz). To ensure the club stayed relevant, it also hosted nights from popular promoters such as Gatecrasher and Bedrock (on a Thursday night until 2005, with resident DJ John Digweed.

2000s
At the beginning of the 2000s, Heaven adopted a more mainstream Tribal house and Disco-influenced sound, employing DJs that had been resident at other major gay London nightclubs such as Trade and Salvation, such as Billy Gonzalez.

In 2003, Virgin sold the club to a consortium which comprised Paul Savory, David Inches, and Jeremy Millins (Pure Group).

Towards the mid 2000s, the music policy of its main room became more underground-oriented, with Progressive, Tech, and Deep House on a Saturday night from resident DJs Pagano and Nick Tcherniak.

G-A-Y
On 22 September 2008, Heaven was purchased by the MAMA Group through its jointly owned subsidiary company G-A-Y Ltd. G-A-Y was a popular and long-running gay night hosted for many years at the London Astoria, and on Friday 3 October 2008, MAMA Group moved G-A-Y to Heaven. Little over a year later, MAMA Group itself was bought by music retailer HMV

When HMV went into administration in 2013, Jeremy Joseph founder of G-A-Y acquired the outstanding shares in G-A-Y Ltd, and with it Heaven.

Asset of Community Value
Heaven was granted Asset of community value status in January 2020

Coronavirus pandemic
Nightclubs across England, including Heaven, were closed for much of the coronavirus pandemic. When it was announced on 14 July 2021 by Prime Minister Boris Johnson that all remaining coronavirus restrictions would be lifted on July 19, Heaven launched a digital clock counting down the hours until nightclubs could reopen. Footage of revellers queuing for Heaven and dancing inside the nightclub to celebrate the final lifting of restrictions in England gained worldwide media attention.

On Sunday 8 August, Heaven opened up between midday and 9pm as a vaccination drop-in centre, offering first doses of Pfizer vaccines and second doses of AstraZeneca vaccines without appointment.

Past performers

Heaven often features live performances by notable artists. These have included, but are not limited to (in alphabetical order):

Heaven Worldwide
The Heaven name has been franchised over the years to ventures in Gran Canaria and Ibiza.

Today

Monday
Monday continues to play host to Popcorn, a largely student night which plays pop and funky house music. It is a predominantly gay event.

Thursday
Thursday plays host to Porn Idol, a strip competition for men and women previously held at the Astoria, with £250 offered to the winner each week. The competition comprises several rounds, with £1,000 awarded to the season winner. It is preceded and followed by three rooms of pop.

Friday
Friday plays host to Camp Attack, a long-running night from the days at the Astoria.

Saturday
Saturday night events continue to mostly feature a live performance.

See also
G-A-Y
List of electronic dance music venues

References

External links
 Club night website
 Live venue website

Buildings and structures in the City of Westminster
1979 establishments in England
LGBT nightclubs in London
Electronic dance music venues